Char Kaona is a village of Jangalia Union, Pakundia Upazila, Kishoreganj District, Bangladesh.

References

Populated places in Dhaka Division